The Medal of Honor was created during the American Civil War and is the highest military decoration presented by the United States government to a member of its armed forces. A recipient must distinguish themselves at the risk of their own life above and beyond the call of duty in action against an enemy of the United States. The medal is presented to the recipient by the President of the United States on behalf of the Congress.

World War II

Vietnam War

The Vietnam War was a military conflict between the Communist-supported Democratic Republic of Vietnam and the United States-supported Republic of Vietnam. It started in 1959 and concluded April 30, 1975 with the defeat and failure of the United States foreign policy in Vietnam.

During the Vietnam War, 246 Medals of Honor were received, 154 of them posthumously.

Notes

References
Inline

Polish-American